Hou Juncheng (born 1963/1964) is a Chinese billionaire businessman. He is the founder and chairman of Proya Cosmetics.

Early life
Hou earned a degree from Tsinghua University.

Career
In 2006, Hou founded Proya Cosmetics in Zhejiang Province. Proya is headquartered in Hangzhou and employs 2,720 people.

In January 2020, with shares in Proya closing at a record high, Hou had an estimate net worth of US$1.2 billion.

Personal life

References

Billionaires from Zhejiang
1960s births
Living people
Chinese company founders
Tsinghua University alumni